Roman Shane de Beer (born 6 October 1994) is a South African racing driver.

Career

Karting
Born in Johannesburg, de Beer began karting in 1999 and raced primarily in his native South Africa for the majority of his karting career, working his way up from the junior ranks to progress through to the Rotax Max category by 2010, and ultimately, winning the ROK Cup International Final.

Formula Abarth
In 2010, de Beer graduated to single–seaters, moving into the newly launched Formula Abarth series in Italy, with Scuderia Victoria World. He scored podiums at Imola, Varano and Vallelunga and finished the season ninth. De Beer stayed in Formula Abarth for a second season in 2011 with the same team, when the series was split into two distinct sub-championships – European and Italian championships. But after three rounds he ended his racing season with a podium at Misano. He finished the season eleventh in the Italian championship standings.

Italian Formula Three
In 2012 De Beer continued his collaboration with Scuderia Victoria into the Italian Formula Three Championship. He finished the season twelfth in the Italian championship standings.

GP3 Series
After missing the 2013 racing season, de Beer then drove for the Trident team in the GP3 Series in 2014.

Racing record

Career summary

† – As de Beer was a guest driver, he was ineligible for points.

Complete GP3 Series results
(key) (Races in bold indicate pole position) (Races in italics indicate fastest lap)

References

External links
 
 

1994 births
Living people
People from Johannesburg
South African racing drivers
Formula Abarth drivers
Italian Formula Three Championship drivers
GP3 Series drivers
Trident Racing drivers